Blue Gender is a Japanese anime television series created by Ryōsuke Takahashi, the creator of Armored Trooper Votoms and Gasaraki, broadcast in Japan from 1999 to 2000 and spanning 26 episodes. Blue Gender was animated by the Japanese studio AIC and distributed in the United States by Funimation - one of the company's first non-Dragon Ball licenses. In 2003, Blue Gender was released on American television as part of Cartoon Network's Adult Swim block, though it had originally been planned for a Toonami broadcast, and was thus edited to remove more of its graphic violence, nudity, and sex scenes than usual, even for Adult Swim's standards. However, it aired uncut on the Funimation Channel in the United States.

Blue Gender is set in the 2030s, in which Earth has been overrun by the Blue-alien insectoid creatures containing a newly evolved B-cell, that kill and harvest humans for food. Most of the surviving human race has moved to Second Earth, a huge space station that orbits the planet. The series focuses on the relationship between Yuji - a human who also possesses the B-cells, and Marlene - a soldier from Second Earth, as they work together to return to Second Earth and subsequently participate in military operations against the Blue.

The series was followed by Blue Gender: The Warrior, a compilation movie with an alternative ending, in 2002. Blue Gender was also broadcast in the United Kingdom from 2002 to 2003 on the Sci Fi Channel.

Plot

In the year 2009, Yuji Kaido is an average young adult male diagnosed with a serious disease (the "B-cells") and is put into cryogenic stasis until a cure is found. Twenty-two years later, he is awakened in the midst of a raging war between armored soldiers and insectoid beings called the "Blue" which have overrun the Earth.

The soldiers are from an orbiting space colony collectively called Second Earth and were ordered to recover "sleepers" around the Earth. Among them is Marlene Angel, who at first appears to be heartless toward others. On the journey to Second Earth, Yuji meets many of the humans that were left behind during the evacuation due to limited resources. Standing orders for Marlene and the other troops are to consider any human survivors on the surface to be already dead, which greatly troubles Yuji.

On their journey, all of the soldiers are killed except for Marlene, causing Yuji to fall into a deep depression as he recognizes the destruction around him and his own inability to save those he cares about. During their travel to Baikonur space base through the mountains, Yuji and Marlene start to develop a bond that softens her sharp edges.

Upon reaching Baikonur, Yuji and Marlene come across another group of soldiers and devise a battle plan to get back to Second Earth. During the operation, Marlene becomes the last surviving pilot and is about to be completely overrun by the Blue. However, just when she is going to self-detonate her Armored Shrike, Yuji, determined not to leave her behind, comes to her rescue with a team of reprogrammed automaton attack sentries. Marlene is overwhelmed by Yuji's efforts to save her. During the shuttle flight to Second Earth, the two expose their emotions for each other, but they are abruptly interrupted when a mutated Blue that had had hid in the shuttle attacks Yuji, critically injuring him.

Yuji and Marlene are separated upon arriving at Second Earth, and Marlene is sent back into training at the education station. Not knowing what happened after he was attacked, Marlene rebels and is bent on finding Yuji. When she does, she finds he has healed and is being trained to use a new specialized "sleeper"-specific Armor Shrike (AS) called the "Double Edge", a battlesuit that is much stronger than the originals used in the war against the Blue. It is revealed that Yuji's illness is the key to destroying the Blue and taking back the planet. He and the other "Sleepers" have "B-cells" which are also the genetic makeup of the Blue.

After intensive training, Yuji and Marlene return to Earth with two other Sleepers named Tony Frost and Alicia Whistle. Tony is an inexperienced AS pilot, but his B-cells give him great AS skills. Alicia is only a young teenager with no combat experience and not much sense of what is going on around her. They and the other forces of Second Earth battle the Blue, successfully destroying a few of the largest nests before they return to Second Earth. However, the battles begin to have a negative effect on Yuji, who has very little regard for human life and is completely obsessed with being better than Tony at killing the Blue. Yuji's actions deeply concern Marlene and she begins to realize something is wrong.

Shortly after returning to Second Earth, the High Council orders the Sleepers on a second offensive against the Blue. Marlene becomes separated from Yuji once again, but in his current state, he does not seem to care. As the Sleepers are carrying out their mission, a battle on Second Earth between two factions is waged. Seno Miyagi, director of Second Earth's science division, leads the "Ark" rebellion and seizes control of the military, lunar resources, and education stations of Second Earth from the High Council, who escape to and retains control of the medical station. Marlene learns about the nature of the illness that put Yuji in stasis, the source of his abilities, and the source of the Blue: they are a defense mechanism enacted by the Earth to purge the existence of humanity, and the B-cells that exist in the Sleepers could become a potential threat to humanity as well.

After the Ark successfully takes over Second Earth from the High Council, Marlene heads down to Earth in search of Yuji. When she finds him, his B-cells are already beginning to activate, and he begins to go berserk as a killing machine. After struggling with him, Marlene is finally able to get through to Yuji and helps him overcome his madness by showing her human emotions and feelings for him. Meanwhile, Tony and an unknowing Alicia have also abandoned the remaining ground forces. The troops fend off waves of Blue before escaping with the few remaining survivors. Tony and a now brainwashed Alicia also eventually return to Second Earth but bring with them several Blue when they board the medical station.

When Yuji and Marlene return to Second Earth, they find that Tony plans to ram the medical station into the military station, which would therefore destroy the heart of Second Earth. He sees this as the "Grand Will of the Earth", in which he will become a "messiah" and cleanse the planet of humanity forever. However, Yuji, Marlene, and a group of other soldiers infiltrate the station and manage to free Alicia's mind after injuring her. Later, Yuji and Marlene confront and eliminate Tony, while Rick, a close friend of theirs, is slaughtered by a Blue. Alicia ventures back to Tony to die with him as the military destroys the medical station.

After the decision by Seno's junta to abandon Earth, Yuji becomes depressed and contemplates his existence, wondering what he has been fighting for, why he was woken, why he cannot save his friends, and what is truly Earth's will. However, Marlene again is able to get through to Yuji; the two realize they need each other, and finally become lovers.

Yuji decides to return to Earth to find out what Earth's will is. After learning from Seno about a new migration pattern of the Blue, Yuji and Marlene take a group of volunteers and head to an area where a massive nest is located. There they find a group of humans surviving in the area. The nest seems impenetrable at first, but they eventually find an entrance with the help of the local people.

The entrance leads to a tunnel where the walls, ceiling, and floor of the cavern are composed of fossil-like Blue. The team finally comes upon a crystal formation in a massive cavern. A huge Blue is birthed from the gel substance sitting atop the formation and kills everyone except for Yuji and Marlene. Yuji kills it and comes to the conclusion that the sphere will hold the answers he seeks. He sends Marlene, who is pregnant with their child, to the surface to wait for him. He then gets a vision and can see what the Earth itself can see. Yuji comes to understand how mankind can live alongside the B-cells and returns to Marlene.

Meanwhile, Second Earth's military station's citizens revolt against Seno. The station's personnel abandon the station for Earth via shuttles. Eventually, a firefight erupts over the last remaining overcrowded shuttle, and the station is destroyed by a massive explosion. All around the world from former Blue Nests, long strings of coalescing energy ascends into Earth's atmosphere and form a ring. Yuji and Marlene watch this, realizing Earth is now safe, and look forward to the rest of their lives together as the sun sets. A final view of the Earth from space is shown with a slightly garbled narration, presumably by the Earth, stating, "Welcome to your next journey".

Main characters
  -  After being diagnosed with an incurable disease (later discovered to be B-cells), Yuji Kaido decides to be put in cryogenic sleep in hopes that an effective treatment will be developed soon. In 2031, twenty-two years later, Yuji wakes up to find the world overrun by a deadly alien species known as the 'Blue'. In 2009 Yuji worked in a gas station, rode his motorcycle, and hung out with his friend Takashi. But in 2031 everything Yuji knew has been destroyed by the Blue. He feels lost and alone in an unforgiving new world. For better or for worse, Yuji is guided by the only thing that he can't trust - his emotions - as he attempts to gain control over his new life. 
  - Orphaned at the age of ten because her parents were killed by the Blue, Marlene was one of the few lucky ones to make it to Second Earth. Since then, Marlene has dedicated and trained herself to defeat the Blue. Though seeming very heartless and cold in the earlier episodes, as time progresses, Yuji opens up Marlene's emotions and a bond is created. As Marlene's emotions begin to resurface, everything she was taught to believe in begins to break down. Towards the end of the series, she and Yuji conceive a child together. 
  - Another Sleeper who unlike Yuji, awoke on Second Earth. A very powerful Sleeper, He is easily the most advanced member of the Sleeper Brigade and trusts no one. Yuji strives to improve himself to be able to beat Tony. Tony seems to have no emotion except for the euphoria of destroying Blue. It becomes apparent in later episodes, however, that he sees himself as a Messiah when his B-cells initiate and has his own plans for the fate of humanity. 
  - Another Sleeper on Second Earth who is paired with Tony. She immediately gravitates towards Yuji, seeing Marlene as an obstacle to a relationship with him. She is very young and often naïve. Her death is one of the many that troubles Yuji. 
 - A high-ranking member of the science division on Second Earth. He suggests that Yuji and Marlene be kept together in order to get the best results from Yuji in the Sleeper program. Not agreeing with the High Council's leadership of Second Earth or its reckless use of the sleepers, he eventually forms a group called The Ark, which would later overthrow the High Council's "government" on Second Earth. Seno would subsequently become the leader of Second Earth, but only for a brief time. His order to abandon Earth eventually results in a revolt and his execution by citizens who wanted to return to Earth. 
  - Rick is a military Elite, and although he fights on the Sleeper Brigade, he is not a Sleeper. He is cocky, confident, and loves strong women, especially Marlene. 
 - Doug is the assistant to the High Council and a high-ranking official on Second Earth. He is the Director of the Military Station, and also participates in High Council inquiries. He is later shot and killed by Miyagi.

Episode list

Blue Gender: The Warrior

Reception
Critical reception of Blue Gender has been mostly positive.

Allen Divers of Anime News Network gave the series a rating of A dubbed and B subbed, praising the story, mecha and monster designs, animation, and characters, with his only complaint being that the series was too long, which slowed down the story telling. Animerica gave the series a positive review, stating that some might compare it to Starship Troopers, and concludes that "if you like action, mecha, hardcore sci-fi, and global plots, this series has a lot to offer." Todd Douglass Jr. of DVD Talk gave the series a rating of 4 out of 5 stars, praising the story, characters, and animation, and stated that "on the surface the show may seem stereotypical and familiar but once you actually delve into its depth you'll recognize it for what it truly is; an awesome show." Nerdgenic.com also gave the series a positive review, with their only criticisms being the main protagonist Yuji, and the slow progression of the plot. They handed out praise for the series' secondary protagonist Marlene, the story, and the mech and monster designs.

Not all reviews were positive, however. Issac Cynova of THEM Anime Reviews was far more critical, and gave the series a rating of 2 out of 5 stars, stating that "Blue Gender is one of those titles that hooks you right from the beginning, but then just fails to deliver."

References

External links
 Blue Gender at AIC studio
 
 Animerica review
 

1999 anime television series debuts
2000 manga
2002 anime films
2002 science fiction films
Alien invasions in television
Animated post-apocalyptic films
Anime International Company
Anime with original screenplays
Female soldier and warrior characters in anime and manga
Films set in 2009
Films set in 2031
Funimation
Horror anime and manga
Kadokawa Shoten manga
Mecha anime and manga
Military science fiction
Post-apocalyptic animated television series
Post-apocalyptic anime and manga
Science fiction war films
TBS Television (Japan) original programming